Abelardo Pardo Lezameta District is one of fifteen districts of the province Bolognesi in Peru.

References

States and territories established in 1956
Districts of the Bolognesi Province
Districts of the Ancash Region